Warrenville is a village in DuPage County, Illinois, United States. The population was 13,553 at the 2020 census. Warrenville is a far west suburb of Chicago in the Illinois Technology and Research Corridor, and is just north of I-88.

History
 
Warrenville was founded in 1833 when Julius Warren and his family moved west from New York to seek a fresh start from a failing gristmill and distillery. Daniel Warren, Julius' father, claimed land at what is now McDowell Woods and Julius claimed land at what is now the Warrenville Grove Forest Preserve.  The first major establishment, an inn and tavern, was built in 1838 by Julius Warren himself, as the family was skilled in timber and grain. The inn still stands today and was renovated in 2002.

The town quickly blossomed with two mills and a plank road connecting it with Naperville and Winfield, on which Julius operated a stagecoach line. The town failed at its bid to have the railroad come through the town. However, in 1902, the Chicago Aurora and Elgin Railroad came through town, which lasted until the late 1950s.

With a population of 4,000, Warrenville was finally incorporated as a city in 1967, following six unsuccessful attempts. The 1970s and 1980s brought westward expansion from the city of Chicago, causing the small farming community's population to nearly double to 7,800.

Geography
Warrenville is located at  (41.826280, -88.189465).

Demographics
As of the 2020 census there were 13,553 people, 5,068 households, and 3,266 families residing in the city. The racial makeup of the city was 67.36% White, 3.02% African American, 1.21% Native American, 5.11% Asian, 0.02% Pacific Islander, 11.22% from other races, and 12.06% from two or more races. Hispanic or Latino of any race were 23.95% of the population.

There were 5,068 households, out of which 50.00% had children under the age of 18 living with them, 49.72% were married couples living together, 12.23% had a female householder with no husband present, and 35.56% were non-families. 26.68% of all households were made up of individuals, and 9.33% had someone living alone who was 65 years of age or older. The average household size was 3.18 and the average family size was 2.57.

The city's age distribution consisted of 21.3% under the age of 18, 9.0% from 18 to 24, 29% from 25 to 44, 27.3% from 45 to 64, and 13.4% who were 65 years of age or older. The median age was 37.8 years. For every 100 females, there were 93.2 males. For every 100 females age 18 and over, there were 99.2 males.

The median income for a household in the city was $86,462, and the median income for a family was $100,388. Males had a median income of $52,470 versus $41,130 for females. The per capita income for the city was $39,721. About 6.4% of families and 8.5% of the population were below the poverty line, including 12.0% of those under age 18 and 12.3% of those age 65 or over.

Neighborhoods
 
There is an "old neighborhood", south, with mixed housing styles near Galusha Avenue. There is a Forest Preserve neighborhood, east, with wooded-lot expensive multi-acre homes close to Cantigny War Museum, Cantigny Golf Course, and Mckee Marsh. In the mid-1970s two large subdivisions were developed in the west, next to Fermilab, a scientific research center where the world's largest superconducting particle accelerator ring was located. The subdivisions are called Summerlakes and Fox Hollow. Other notable subdivisions of Warrenville include Warrenville Lakes, Saddle Ridge, Thornwilde, Edgebrook, River Oaks, and Maple Hill.

Cantera
Cantera was built from a TIF district on the former grounds  limestone quarry. Located on the district is a 30-screen Regal Cinemas movie theater, family entertainment center Main Event Entertainment, several restaurants (California Pizza Kitchen, Red Robin, Twin Peaks, Rock Bottom Brewery, Buffalo Wild Wings, Eddie Merlots, and more), a Super Target retail store, three hotels, three banks, a  Life Time Fitness club, numerous corporate offices, and two residential complexes. Major companies that have office space and research facilities at Cantera include: BP America, the corporate office for EN Engineering, the corporate headquarters for Symbria, and a corporate office for Exelon Nuclear. Also, the headquarters of the International Brotherhood of Electrical Workers (IBEW) Local 701 of DuPage County is in Cantera.

Downtown
Downtown Warrenville is located at the intersection of Butterfield Road and Batavia Road. The addition of another TIF district, a new police station was built in 1998, a new City Hall in 2001, a new Public Works Building in 2002, and additions were made to the library in 2003/2017.

Economy
Durham School Services is a company based in Warrenville. Navistar left Warrenville in 2011, and moved to neighboring Lisle due to tax incentives.

Top employers
According to the City's 2018 Comprehensive Annual Financial Report, the top ten non-city employers in the city are:

Education
Warrenville is a part of Community Unit School District 200, and shares 20 schools with Wheaton. Residents of Warrenville attend Bower or Johnson elementary school, Hubble Middle School, and Wheaton Warrenville South High School. Wheaton Warrenville South High School is located in Wheaton. Until 2009, Hubble was also located in Wheaton; however, in time for the 2009–2010 school year, a new Hubble was opened in Warrenville, and the new building is one of a very few schools to meet the LEED certification standards for energy-efficient design.  Some children from all over DuPage County attend Four Winds Waldorf School, a private PreK-8 school in Warrenville.
Warrenville is also home to the Illinois Youth Center, a correctional facility for female juvenile offenders.

Library
 
Ten years later, the library closed due to a lack of volunteers and funding. The Warrenville Public Library District was formed by a referendum held in February 1979 with the citizens approving a 15-cent rate for library services. In 1986, voters approved another 15-cent tax rate increase to build and operate a  facility on Stafford Place. In September 2003, a large addition and renovation project which tripled the size of the facility was completed. The building was made possible by the City of Warrenville TIF funds. The Warrenville Public Library District is a member of the DuPage Library System.

Notable people 

 Adam Emory Albright, figure-in-landscape painter
 Ivan Albright, magic realist painter
 Dustin Byfuglien, Right Wing/Defense for Winnipeg Jets of NHL, won Stanley Cup in 2010 with the Chicago Blackhawks
 Brooks McCormick (1917–2006) chief executive officer of International Harvester, philanthropist and equestrian
 Chauncey McCormick (1884–1954) art collector and father of Brooks McCormick
 Tony Moeaki, Tight End for The Chicago Bears
 Miles J. Stanford, Christian author
 Jack Steadman, former president and general manager of the Kansas City Chiefs
 John Maynard Woodworth, first Surgeon General of the United States

References

External links

 Warrenville Home Page
 Warrenville Library Home Page
 Julius M. Warren Biography

 
Chicago metropolitan area
Cities in Illinois
Populated places established in 1833
Cities in DuPage County, Illinois
1833 establishments in Illinois